Angerbach is a right tributary of the Rhine in North Rhine-Westphalia, Germany. It flows through Wülfrath and Ratingen, and discharges into the Rhine in Angerhausen, a district in the southern part of Duisburg.

See also
List of rivers of North Rhine-Westphalia

Rivers of North Rhine-Westphalia
Rivers of Germany